Kirra Dibb (born 23 July 1997) is an Australian rugby league footballer who plays for the Newcastle Knights in the NRL Women's Premiership.

She previously played for the Sydney Roosters and New Zealand Warriors in the NRL Women's Premiership, and the North Sydney Bears in the NSWRL Women's Premiership.

Background
Dibb was born in North Gosford and is a Kincumber Colts junior and is of Indigenous Australian descent. She stopped playing rugby league as a 10-year old as there were no girl's competitions to compete in, instead playing touch football and Oztag.

Playing career

2019
In 2019, Dibb returned to rugby league, joining the North Sydney Bears in the NSWRL Women's Premiership. In May, she represented NSW Country at the Women's National Championships. 

In July, she joined the Sydney Roosters NRL Women's Premiership side. In Round 1 of the 2019 NRL Women's season, she made her debut in a 12–16 loss to the New Zealand Warriors.

In October, Dibb represented three Australian sides – the Prime Minister's XIII in their win over the Fiji Prime Minister's XIII, the Australia 9s team at the 2019 Rugby League World Cup 9s and the Australian Jillaroos in their 28–8 win over New Zealand.

2020
In September, she joined the New Zealand Warriors NRL Women's Premiership side for the 2020 NRL Women's season, playing three games for the club.

2021
On 3 December, Dibb signed with the Newcastle Knights to be a part of their inaugural NRLW squad.

2022
In round 1 of the delayed 2021 NRL Women's season, Dibb made her club debut for the Knights against the Parramatta Eels.

On 24 June, Dibb made her return to the Origin arena starting at five-eighth in a victorious effort. The 20-14 victory featured a 40 metre solo try from Dibb to cap off her successful return to the game's biggest stage.

On 12 September, Dibb was named the Harvey Norman NSW Women's Premiership player of the year following a 2022 campaign that resulted in a Minor Premiership and sudden death finals exit.

On 2 October, Dibb played in the Knights' 2022 NRLW Grand Final win over the Parramatta Eels, kicking a goal in the Knights' 32-12 victory.

References

External links
Newcastle Knights profile
New Zealand Warriors profile

1997 births
Living people
Australian female rugby league players
Indigenous Australian rugby league players
Australia women's national rugby league team players
Rugby league five-eighths
Sydney Roosters (NRLW) players
New Zealand Warriors (NRLW) players
Newcastle Knights (NRLW) players
Touch footballers